Masques is the third album by the British jazz fusion group Brand X. This was the band's first studio recording without drummer Phil Collins. The rear of the album cover has a photo of the crowd from the Knebworth Festival, 1978 — a bill that included both Brand X and Genesis, Collins' other band.

Track listing 
Side one
 "The Poke" (Goodsall) - 5:10
 "Masques" (Jones, Robinson) - 3:16
 "Black Moon" (Pert) - 4:48
 "Deadly Nightshade" (Pert) - 11:22
Side two
 "Earth Dance" (Pert) - 6:06
 "Access to Data" (Goodsall) - 8:00
 "The Ghost of Mayfield Lodge" (Jones) - 10:17

Personnel
Brand X
 John Goodsall – guitar
 J. Peter Robinson – keyboards
 Percy Jones – bass
 Chuck Burgi – drums
 Morris Pert – percussion, electric piano (3)

Notes
 "The Ghost of Mayfield Lodge" is based on a true story (see this page for more info) about a carriage house where Percy Jones was staying which was said to be haunted.
 This album is the first album on which Percy Jones played the fretless Wal bass, which became his trademark sound.

References

External links
 

Brand X albums
1978 albums
Charisma Records albums
Albums recorded at Trident Studios